Gayson Gregory (born 5 April 1982) is an Antiguan footballer who plays for Antigua Barracuda FC in the USL Professional Division and the Antigua and Barbuda national team.

Club career
Born in Bolands, Gregory was named Most Valuable Player of the 1999 season at the Antigua Football Association’s Hall of Fame induction. He joined Trinidadian side Joe Public F.C. in March 2001 to embark a career in professional football, whilst completing his secondary education. Gregory denied rumours linking him with a move to Hoppers FC in August 2003, but a month later did move to Hoppers. It was revealed in 2005 that Gregory was registered with two teams, Freemansville and Wadadli FC, and that Freemansville had made a request for him to be released from his contract with Wadadli.

Gregory scored 13 goals in the Antigua and Barbuda Premier Division in the 2006–07 season. He went for trials with AFC Bournemouth and Nottingham Forest following the closure of the 2006–07 season, and also went on trial with York City after he and Damien Farrell had been recommended by Bryan Hamilton, a consultant for the Antiguan national team. He and Farrell were however sent back to their homeland, but York manager Billy McEwan said he and Farrell could still be brought back on trial throughout the season.

It was reported that Gregory was to return to England within a few weeks after returning home. He was to return to York City for additional trials before the end of August, but went to play for San Juan Jabloteh for the remainder of their season. He scored four goals in the Pro League for San Juan, but scored eight goals overall. He joined Montreal Impact in the USL First Division in August 2008, but left in January 2009 to rejoin Freemansville.

International career
Nicknamed Bubbler, Gregory earned his first cap for Antigua and Barbuda in 2000. He was joint seventh top scorer of the 2007 CONCACAF Gold Cup Qualifying with two goals. He has participated in nine FIFA World Cup qualification games, and was part of the Antigua squad which took part in the final stages of the 2010 Caribbean Championship.

National team statistics

References

External links
 
 
 Gayson Gregory profile at the Montreal Impact website

1982 births
Living people
Antigua and Barbuda footballers
Antigua and Barbuda international footballers
Antigua and Barbuda expatriate footballers
Association football forwards
Joe Public F.C. players
San Juan Jabloteh F.C. players
Montreal Impact (1992–2011) players
Antigua Barracuda F.C. players
TT Pro League players
USL First Division players
USL Championship players
Expatriate soccer players in Canada
Expatriate footballers in Trinidad and Tobago
Antigua and Barbuda expatriate sportspeople in Trinidad and Tobago
People from Saint Mary Parish, Antigua
Old Road F.C. players